Adarer Bon ( Dear sister) is a 1997 Bengali drama film directed by Swapan Saha. The film's music was composed by Anupam Dutta.The film starring Prosenjit Chatterjee and Rituparna Sengupta in the lead roles.

Cast
 Prosenjit Chatterjee
 Biplab Chatterjee
 Rituparna Sengupta
 Abhishek Chatterjee
 Anju Ghosh
 Subhendu Chatterjee

Awards
BFJA Awards (1997):-
 Best Editing-Ujjal Nandi

References

External links
 Adarer Bon at the Gomolo

Bengali-language Indian films
1997 films
Films scored by Anupam Dutta
1990s Bengali-language films
Films directed by Swapan Saha
Indian drama films